The Word & Sardines is the debut single recorded and released by the Washington, D.C.-based go-go group Junkyard Band.

Track listing

A-side
"The Word" – 6:09  
"The Word" (short version) – 3:31

B-side
"Sardines" – 6:45

Samples

 Beastie Boys ("The Maestro (Live)")
 Cut Chemist ("King Kumoniwanaleia")
 Invisibl Skratch Piklz ("Invisbl Skratch Piklz vs. Da Klamz Uv Deth")
 Masters Of Ceremony ("Cracked Out")
 MC Zappa ("The Jam")
 Stetsasonic ("We're The Band")
 Timbaland ("Clock Strikes (Remix)")

References

1986 songs
1986 debut singles
Def Jam Recordings singles
Go-go songs
Song recordings produced by Rick Rubin